Abysov (masculine) or Abysova (feminine) is a Russian last name, a variant of Abyzov. The following people bear this last name:
Irina Abysova (b. 1980), Russian open water swimmer and triathlete

References

Notes

Sources
И. М. Ганжина (I. M. Ganzhina). "Словарь современных русских фамилий" (Dictionary of Modern Russian Last Names). Москва, 2001. 

Russian-language surnames
